CFR Title 18 – Conservation of Power and Water Resources is one of 50 titles composing the United States Code of Federal Regulations (CFR) and contains the principal set of rules and regulations issued by federal agencies regarding the conservation of power and water resources. It is available in digital and printed form and can be referenced online using the Electronic Code of Federal Regulations (e-CFR).

Structure 

The table of contents, as reflected in the e-CFR updated March 4, 2014, is as follows:

 18